The Hounds of God is the third novel in The Hound and the Falcon trilogy by Judith Tarr, published in 1986.

Plot summary
The Hounds of God is a novel in which the elven elite suffer religious persecution.

Reception
Dave Langford reviewed The Hounds of God for White Dwarf #92, and stated that "all a bit reminiscent of Kurtz's Deryni books, but Tarr is the better writer."

Reviews
Review by Faren Miller (1986) in Locus, #301 February 1986
Review by Don D'Ammassa (1986) in Science Fiction Chronicle, #87 December 1986
Review by Charles de Lint (1987) in Fantasy Review, March 1987
Review by Chris Barker (1987) in Vector 140

Awards and nominations

References

1986 American novels
1986 fantasy novels
American fantasy novels